A kabal is the name given to a  patch of desert, with  berms bulldozed to form the perimeter earthworks. Soldiers assigned to these remote sites must maintain 24-hour operations as units are close to the Iraqi border.

Description
Kabals contain dining facilities, air-conditioned sleeping tents, recreation facilities and storage for weapons, tanks and their armored vehicles. The kabals are named New York, New Jersey, Connecticut, Pennsylvania and Virginia. Three others, "Diamond Head", "Camp Concho", and "Hunter" are apparently inactive. The kabals are tent cities with each camp containing large areas of tents each housing six soldiers, mess halls, rows of portable toilets, and trailers with sinks and showers and a gym. Tents are equipped with telephones. For recreation there are a variety of movies, games, and a computer room. 

The walls usually form a circle that has one or two entrances guarded by soldiers with other soldiers on guard duty around the perimeter or in guard towers. Establishing kabals is manpower- and supply-intensive, requiring many convoys of Class IV (construction and barrier materiel) and contracted items. Combat Regeneration and Reorganization [CR2] is the redeployment of equipment, vehicles and soldiers from the Kabal.

History
Kabals were established shortly after Operation Desert Storm as part of a U.S. mission to protect Kuwait with a battle-ready battalion and to train service members for possible future wars against Iraq.

See also
 Fort

External links
 Global Security article

Military installations of the United States in Kuwait